Sri Kanakamalaxmi Recording Dance Troupe is a 1988 Indian Telugu-language film directed by Vamsy, starring Naresh and Madhuri. It was produced by Sravanthi Ravi Kishore, under Sri Sravanthi Movies. The chartbuster music was composed by Ilaiyaraaja.

Plot
Papa Rao runs the Sri Kanakamahalakshmi Recording Dance Troupe, in Rajahmundry, Andhra Pradesh. Gopalam and Sita work as dancers in the troupe. Gopalam is a naive and timid man, who loves Sita, but cannot muster enough courage to reveal his feelings to her. Dorababu is also a dancer, in the troupe, and lusts after Sita. How Gopalam gains confidence to reveal his feelings to Sita and keep Dorababu in check, forms the remainder of the story.

Cast
Naresh as Gopalam
Madhuri as Sita
Kota Srinivasa Rao as Papa Rao
Tanikella Bharani as Dorababu
Mallikarjuna Rao as Abbulu
Rallapalli as Cylone Subbarao
Nirmalamma as Paadi Sundaramma, Sita's grandmother
Y. Vijaya as Anantha Lakshmi
Bheemaraju  as Gavarraju
Dham
Sandhya as Pattu Padmini
Rambabu as N.T.R.
Veerraju as A.N.R.
Venkatesh as Chiranjeevi

Track listing

References

External links 
 

1987 films
1980s Telugu-language films
Films directed by Vamsy
Films scored by Ilaiyaraaja